The 2011–12 season was the 90th season of competitive association football and eighth season in the Football Conference played by York City Football Club, a professional football club based in York, North Yorkshire, England. Their eighth-place finish in 2010–11 meant it was their eighth successive season in the Conference Premier. The season covers the period from 1 July 2011 to 30 June 2012.

Gary Mills, who was starting his first full season as manager, signed 11 players before the summer transfer window closed. York occupied a play-off position for most of the season, and finished the Conference Premier season in fourth place. They beat Mansfield Town 2–1 on aggregate in the play-off semi-final. Luton Town were then beaten 2–1 in the 2012 Conference Premier play-off Final at Wembley Stadium, which meant the club was promoted to League Two, returning into the Football League after an eight-year absence. Eight days beforehand, York won their first national knockout competition, with a 2–0 victory over Newport County at Wembley Stadium in the 2012 FA Trophy Final. They were knocked out of the 2011–12 FA Cup in the fourth qualifying round, after being beaten 2–1 away to Wrexham.

30 players made at least one appearance in nationally organised first-team competition, and there were 19 different goalscorers. Goalkeeper Michael Ingham, defender James Meredith and midfielder Paddy McLaughlin missed only three of the 58 competitive matches played over the season. Matty Blair finished as leading scorer with 20 goals, of which 10 came in league competition, eight came in the FA Trophy and two came in the play-offs. The winner of the Clubman of the Year, voted for by the club's supporters, was Scott Kerr for his first full season with the club.

Background and pre-season

Just over a month into the 2010–11 season, manager Martin Foyle resigned with York City 15th in the league table. Tamworth manager Gary Mills took over, and after pushing for a play-off place the team finished the 2010–11 Conference Premier in eighth place. Released following the end of the season were Neil Barrett, Chris Carruthers, Leon Constantine, Liam Darville, Michael Gash, Levi Mackin and Andy McWilliams. George Purcell, Michael Rankine, Jonathan Smith, Peter Till and Greg Young also left the club after departing for Dover Athletic, Aldershot Town, Swindon Town, Fleetwood Town and Alfreton Town respectively. Jamal Fyfield, Michael Ingham and James Meredith signed new contracts with York, with David McDermott being retained on non-contract terms.

New additions in defence ahead of the season's start included goalkeeper Paul Musselwhite from Lincoln City and defender Lanre Oyebanjo from Histon. Midfielders to sign were Paddy McLaughlin from Newcastle United, Adriano Moke from Jerez Industrial (via the Glenn Hoddle Academy), and Michael Potts from Blackburn Rovers, with winger Matty Blair joining from Kidderminster Harriers. Strikers Ashley Chambers, who had been on loan the previous season, and Liam Henderson signed from Championship clubs Leicester City and Watford respectively. Striker Jason Walker was the only player signed for a fee, having cost £60,000 from Luton Town.

New home and away kits were introduced for the second successive summer, the home kit featuring red shirts with a white 'V' shape decoration toward the top of the shirt, light blue shorts with white trims on each side and white socks. The away kit included light blue shirts with the same 'V' shape decoration, white shorts with light blue trims on each side and light blue socks. Pryers Solicitors continued as shirt sponsors for the third successive season.

Review

August

Walker scored an 83rd-minute penalty kick and a 90th-minute header to give York a 2–1 victory away to Ebbsfleet United in the opening match of the season. A second victory came in York's first home match of the season, a 3–1 victory over Barrow, with Walker, McLaughlin and Blair scoring. Former Stockport County winger Danny Pilkington was signed on non-contract terms following a trial with the club. The team's first defeat of the season came after going down 1–0 at home to AFC Telford United, after former York striker Craig Farrell scored an 87th-minute goal. York responded to this by defeating Kettering Town 5–1 away, with Boucaud, Walker and Moke scoring in the first half and debutant Pilkington scoring the fifth in stoppage time. Shortly after this match, Kettering midfielder Jon Challinor was signed by York on a contract until January 2012. York picked up their first clean sheet of the season after drawing 0–0 away to Fleetwood Town. A second successive defeat at home came after losing 1–0 to Alfreton Town, with former York player Levi Mackin scoring the only goal with a penalty.

September
Walker scored what proved to be only a consolation after scoring in the 84th minute against Tamworth, with York losing 2–1 away after conceding two penalties, both of which were awarded from fouls committed by Chris Smith. York's first victory in four matches came after Jamie Reed scored an 88th-minute winner to give the team a 1–0 win at home to Bath City. This was followed by a 3–0 win away to league leaders Wrexham, with first half goals from McLaughlin, Chambers and Reed handing York victory. York then drew 2–2 at home to Darlington; Reed opened the scoring in the second minute with a shot into the top corner from the edge of the penalty area, and in the 79th minute Walker scored with a curling shot into the top corner to equalise for York. Chambers and Walker scored first half goals as York defeated Luton 3–0 at home. After a four-match unbeaten run York were defeated 3–2 away to Gateshead, with former York loanee Jon Shaw scoring their three goals, and Walker and a Curtis own goal making up York's tally.

October

Following defeat to Gateshead, York beat Stockport County 2–1 away after Blair and Walker scored second-half goals. York then went on to beat Braintree Town 6–2 at home, with Chambers, McLaughlin, Fyfield, Walker and Moke scoring. Chambers scored in the 62nd minute with York's goal in a 1–1 draw away to Southport, before the home team scored an equaliser nine minutes from time. Chambers scored an 86th-minute winner in a 2–1 victory at home to Grimsby Town, in which Walker had earlier scored with a bicycle kick for York in the first half. Walker scored twice at home against Cambridge United to give York a 2–2 draw, with the equaliser being scored direct from a free kick in the 89th minute. York then beat Hayes & Yeading United 4–2 away, with Walker, Challinor, McLaughlin and Chambers scoring. York were knocked out of the FA Cup in the fourth qualifying round after losing 2–1 away to Conference Premier league leaders Wrexham, with McLaughlin scoring York's only goal.

November
A second match with Wrexham in eight days finished in a 0–0 draw at home, with Ingham making a number of fine saves to preserve the clean sheet. Henderson was signed by fellow Conference Premier club Forest Green Rovers on a one-month loan. York drew 0–0 draw away to Barrow, with Walker and Boucaud being sent off during stoppage time. Striker Moses Ashikodi was signed on loan from league rivals Kettering until January 2012. Reed gave York the lead away to Forest Green after scoring a penalty in the 83rd minute, before the home team scored an equaliser in the fourth minute of stoppage time. York defeated Lincoln 2–0 at home with Pilkington and McLaughlin scoring in each half.

December
A second successive victory came after a 7–0 win at home to Kettering, in which Ashikodi scored against his parent club for his first for York goal. The other scorers were Reed, Challinor, Blair, McLaughlin and Chambers. York were held to a 0–0 draw away to Telford, in which Boucaud, Blair and Walker were denied from scoring by opposition goalkeeper Ryan Young during the first 15 minutes. Challinor scored during stoppage time to secure an FA Trophy first round replay with Conference North team Solihull Moors, with the match ending a 2–2 draw at home. York won the replay away to Solihull 3–0, with Smith scoring his first goal of the season and Blair scoring twice. York suffered their first league defeat since September after losing 3–2 at home to Kidderminster. Henderson scored his first goal for York with the equaliser away to Mansfield Town on Boxing Day, which finished a 1–1 draw.

January

York were 2–0 down in their New Year's Day fixture at home to Mansfield until the 77th minute when Blair scored, and in the first minute of stoppage time substitute Fyfield scored the equaliser to draw the match at 2–2. Ashikodi was signed on a permanent contract until the end of the season, having scored one goal in six appearances for the club while on loan. Challinor signed an extended contract until the end of the season, while McDermott was allowed to join Telford after being unable to break into the team. Henderson joined Forest Green for a second loan spell, signing until the end of the season. On the same day, York signed former Fleetwood midfielder Scott Brown on a contract until the end of the season. Blair scored both of York's goals in a 2–0 victory away to Lincoln, which was the team's first win in five league matches. Striker Matthew Blinkhorn was signed on a contract until the end of the season after his contract with League of Ireland Premier Division club Sligo Rovers expired.

York won their FA Trophy second round match away to Salisbury City 6–2, with Blair, Reed, McLaughlin and Blinkhorn scoring the goals. York defeated Ebbsfleet 3–2 at home for a second successive league win, in which Blair scored twice and Meredith scored his first goal of the season. Smith scored York's goal in a 1–1 draw away to Kidderminster with a 57th-minute header, before the home team equalised in the 85th minute. York fought back from two goals down in the following match away to Darlington, with Smith and Chambers scoring in the second half. Transfer deadline day saw the departure of Boucaud to Luton for a fee of £25,000, while midfielder Erik Tønne was signed on loan from Sheffield United until the end of the season.

February
Free agents Chris Doig, a defender who previously played for Aldershot Town, and Ben Swallow, a winger who previously played for Bristol Rovers, were signed on contracts until the end of the season. Middlesbrough defender Ben Gibson was signed on loan until the end of the season. York progressed to the quarter-finals of the FA Trophy after Ebbsfleet were beaten 1–0 at home in the third round, courtesy of a second half Blair goal. Reed and Blinkhorn scored late goals to give York a 2–1 victory at home to Stockport, with the visitors having taken the lead earlier in the second half. York suffered their first defeat in eight league matches after losing 2–1 at home to Gateshead. Progression to the semi-final of the FA Trophy for the third time in five seasons came after York defeated Grimsby 1–0 away in the quarter-final, in which Scott Kerr scored his first goal for the club.

March

Oyebanjo, with his first goal for the club, and Walker scored to give York a 2–0 victory at home to Hayes. This was followed by a 0–0 home draw with Tamworth. York defeated Luton in the first leg of the FA Trophy semi-final at home, with Reed scoring a penalty in a 1–0 victory. Fyfield scored the winning goal away to Grimsby during stoppage time with a 25-yard shot, after Reed and Smith had scored York's earlier goals in a 3–2 victory. York reached the FA Trophy final for the second time in four seasons after drawing 1–1 away to Luton in the semi-final second leg, with Blair scoring a 90th-minute equaliser, meaning the team went through 2–1 on aggregate. Free agent midfielder Eugen Bopp was signed on a contract until the end of the season after a trial. York were beaten 2–1 at home to Southport, with Reed's 84th-minute goal not being enough to earn York any points, after the visitors had scored twice earlier in the second half. McLaughlin scored for the first time since December with the only goal in a 1–0 victory away to Bath, which restored York's position in the play-offs. A second goal in two matches from McLaughlin saw York equalise away to Luton in the 81st minute, before Meredith scored an 86th-minute winner in a 2–1 victory.

April
McLaughlin's third goal in three matches came in a 2–1 defeat away to Newport County, with the home team scoring the winner 20 minutes from time through Romone Rose. York lost a second match in a row when being beaten 1–0 at home by league leaders Fleetwood, in which former York striker Richard Brodie scored the only goal in the 73rd minute. Blair and Oyebanjo scored in the second half to give York a 2–0 victory away to Alfreton. Swallow was prematurely released by the club because of an internal issue. York drew 1–1 at home to Newport with Walker scoring a second half equaliser, which was his first goal from open play since 22 October. Musselwhite was forced to make his debut in York's away match against Cambridge due to an injury to Ingham, with York winning 1–0 through a second half Walker goal. York were guaranteed a play-off place after beating Braintree 1–0 away, with Tønne scoring his first goal for the club in the 75th minute. The league campaign concluded after a 1–0 victory at home to Forest Green, with Moke scoring in the 82nd minute. The result meant York finished fourth in the Conference Premier table and that they would play third-placed Mansfield in the play-off semi-final. Following the match, Kerr was named as the season's Clubman of the Year, voted for by the club's supporters.

May

York drew 1–1 with Mansfield at home in the first leg of the play-off semi-final. Mansfield took the lead in the 26th minute after Exodus Geohaghon's long throw was headed in by Ross Dyer, before York equalised on 42 minutes after Geohaghon scored an own goal from a Challinor cross. York defeated Mansfield 1–0 after extra time in the second leg after Blair scored a header from a Walker cross in the 111th minute. With an aggregate score of 2–1 York progressed to the play-off final to play Luton. The club won its first national knockout competition, and first piece of silverware in 19 years, after Newport were defeated 2–0 in the 2012 FA Trophy Final at Wembley Stadium, with Blair and Oyebanjo scoring in the second half. Days after the Trophy victory, plans for a community stadium to be built at Monks Cross, which would be shared by York City and rugby league team York City Knights, were approved by City of York Council.

On 20 May 2012, York regained their Football League status with promotion to League Two after a 2–1 win over Luton in the 2012 Conference Premier play-off Final at Wembley Stadium. Luton took the lead when Andre Gray scored in the second minute, before Chambers scored the equaliser on 26 minutes with a low shot from a Smith hooked cross. The winner came two minutes into the second half after Blair, despite being in an offside position, scored from close range after latching onto Daniel Parslow's header. After the match, Blair was quoted as saying "I scored the goal and it feels unbelievable but I'm not taking anything away from the other lads today. The back five, and Daniel Parslow in front, defended like heroes and were brilliant all game". Mills summarised York's achievements by saying "To come to Wembley Stadium two weeks running and do the double is an incredible feeling. In fact, with the ground announcement, it's been a terrific treble and probably the best hat-trick ever at York City Football Club".

The day after the play-off final, thousands turned out to witness the club's players, management, staff and directors ride through York city centre on an open-topped bus, in celebration of what The Press described as "an unsurpassed nine days in the Minstermen's proud existence".

Summary and aftermath
York occupied a play-off position for the majority of the season, briefly rising as high as first place during the first month of the season while never dropping below 14th. For the third time in the space of six seasons, York had a better record away than at home in the league. The team won 12 matches, drew eight and lost three away, compared to winning 11, drawing six and losing six at home. Ingham, McLaughlin and Meredith recorded the highest number of appearances during the season, each appearing in 55 of York's 58 matches. Blair was top scorer in all competitions with 20 goals, followed by Walker, whose 18 goals made him York's leading league scorer. Three other players, Chambers, McLaughlin and Reed, reached double figures.

Prior to the club's Football League return, York released Ashikodi, Blinkhorn, Bopp and Brown, while Meredith, Moke and Pilkington left on their own accord for Bradford City, Cambridge and Kidderminster. Challinor, Chambers, Doig, Fyfield, Ingham, Kerr and Parslow signed new contracts with the club. New players to join were defender Danny Blanchett from Burton Albion, midfielders Lee Bullock from Bradford, John McReady from Darlington and Jonathan Smith from Swindon, winger Michael Coulson from Grimsby, and striker Oli Johnson from Oxford United. Midfielder Tom Platt was promoted to the first-team squad from the youth team after signing a professional contract with the club.

Match details
League positions are sourced by Statto, while the remaining information is referenced individually.

Conference Premier

League table (part)

FA Cup

FA Trophy

Conference Premier play-offs

Transfers

In

 Brackets around club names denote the player's contract with that club had expired before he joined York.

Out

 Brackets around club names denote the player joined that club after his York contract expired.

Loans in

Loans out

Appearances and goals
Source:

Numbers in parentheses denote appearances as substitute.
Players with names struck through and marked  left the club during the playing season.
Players with names in italics and marked * were on loan from another club for the whole of their season with York.
Players listed with no appearances have been in the matchday squad but only as unused substitutes.
Key to positions: GK – Goalkeeper; DF – Defender; MF – Midfielder; FW – Forward

See also
List of York City F.C. seasons

References

2011-12
2011–12 Football Conference by team
Foot